Prorok (Czech feminine: Proroková) is a surname. It means "prophet" in Czech, Polish, Serbo-Croatian, and related languages. Notable people with the surname include:

 Byron Khun de Prorok (1896–1954), American amateur archaeologist
 Ivo Prorok (born 1969), Czech ice hockey player
 Josef Prorok (born 1987), Czech track and field athlete
 Snežana Prorok (born 1994), Bosnian beauty pageant contestant

See also

References

Czech-language surnames
Polish-language surnames
Serbian surnames